Jean Gachet (2 June 1894 in Saint-Étienne – 4 February 1968) was a French featherweight boxer. He competed in the 1920s. Gachet won a silver medal at the 1920 Summer Olympics, losing to Paul Fritsch in the final.

Olympic results
1st round bye
Defeated Arthur Olsen (Norway)
Defeated Philippe Bouvy (Belgium)
Defeated Jack Zivic (United States)
Lost to Paul Fritsch (France)

References

1894 births
1968 deaths
Featherweight boxers
Olympic boxers of France
Boxers at the 1920 Summer Olympics
Olympic silver medalists for France
Sportspeople from Saint-Étienne
Olympic medalists in boxing
French male boxers
Medalists at the 1920 Summer Olympics